The Arizona Raiders is a 1936 American Western film directed by James P. Hogan and starring Buster Crabbe and Marsha Hunt. It was based on a Zane Grey novel and released by Paramount Pictures.

The film is also known as Bad Men of Arizona (American reissue title).

Premise
Nelson saves himself and Wilson from hanging. They acquire jobs at Linday's ranch and then foil horse thieves.

Cast 
Buster Crabbe as "Laramie" Nelson
Raymond Hatton as "Tracks" Williams
Marsha Hunt as Harriett Lindsay
Betty Jane Rhodes as Lenta Lindsay
Johnny Downs as "Lonesome" Alonzo Q. Mulhall
Grant Withers as Monroe Adams, Harriett's lawyer
Don Rowan as Henchman Luke Arledge
Arthur Aylesworth as Andy Winthrop
Richard Carle as Boswell Albernathy, Justice of the Peace
Herbert Heywood as First Sheriff at Hanging
Petra Silva as Tiny - the Maid

Soundtrack 
 Betty Jane Rhodes - "My Melancholy Baby" (Written by Ernie Burnett, lyrics by George A Norton)

External links 

1936 films
1936 Western (genre) films
Films based on works by Zane Grey
American Western (genre) films
American black-and-white films
1930s English-language films
Films based on American novels
Films based on Western (genre) novels
Films directed by James Patrick Hogan
Paramount Pictures films
1930s American films